Nicolas Galazzi (born 18 December 2000) is an Italian professional footballer who plays as a winger for  club Brescia.

Club career
Formed on Academia Pavese and Inter Milan, Galazzi was loaned to Serie D club Fanfulla in 2018, where he made his senior debut.

He left Inter in 2019, and joined Piacenza. Piacenza loaned the player to Serie D club USD Vigor Carpaneto.

In 2021, he signed for Venezia. He made his Serie A debut as a late substitute on 22 August 2021 against Napoli.

On 28 August 2021, he was loaned to Triestina.

On 30 June 2022, Galazzi moved to Brescia as a part of the move of Jesse Joronen from Brescia to Venezia.

References

External links
 
 

2000 births
Living people
Sportspeople from Pavia
Footballers from Lombardy
Italian footballers
Association football wingers
Serie A players
Serie C players
Serie D players
Inter Milan players
A.S.D. Fanfulla players
Piacenza Calcio 1919 players
Venezia F.C. players
U.S. Triestina Calcio 1918 players
Brescia Calcio players